America the Beautiful is a docuseries that aims to showcase North America's natural diversity and extreme conditions. The series is narrated by Michael B. Jordan and premiered on Disney+ on July 4, 2022 as a Disney+ Original, under the National Geographic banner.

Production 
National Geographic produced the series as a streaming exclusive for Disney. Before the showed premiered in July 2022, Disney announced that they would be working with V/SPEED Films on the series, who supplied footage that was captured using cinema-grade cameras mounted to fighter jets, which is a first for the industry.

Episodes

Release 
The series was released on July 4, 2022, coinciding with Independence Day in the United States.

References 

2020s American documentary television series
Nature educational television series
Disney+ original programming
2022 American television series debuts